Fredua Koranteng Adu (born June 2, 1989) is an Ghanaian-born American professional soccer player who played as an attacking midfielder. The last club he played for was Ettan Fotboll club Österlen FF.

From before the time of his signing with D.C. United at the age of 14, Adu was spoken of as "the next Pelé". However, after leaving D.C. United in 2006, he became a journeyman, playing for fifteen teams in nine countries: the United States, Portugal, Monaco, Greece, Turkey, Brazil, Serbia, Finland, and Sweden.

At D.C. United, Adu broke several records. First, he became the youngest athlete ever to sign a professional contract in the United States at 14 years old, after he was selected by the team in the 2004 MLS SuperDraft in January 2004. Three months later, he became the youngest player to appear in a Major League Soccer (MLS) game when he came on as a substitute in a game against the San Jose Earthquakes, and on April 17, he became the youngest scorer in MLS history, scoring a goal in a 3–2 loss to the MetroStars.

Making his full international debut for the United States national team at the age of 16 in 2006, he has won 17 caps for his country and was a part of the US squads at the 2009 FIFA Confederations Cup as well as at the 2009 and 2011 CONCACAF Gold Cups. He also represented the United States Olympic team at the 2008 Summer Olympics.

Early life
Adu was born and raised in the port city of Tema, Ghana, where he played soccer against men three times his age. In 1997, when he was eight, his mother, Emelia Adu, won a green card through the Diversity Immigrant Visa lottery, and his family moved to Rockville, Maryland, in the United States, where he attended Sequoyah Elementary School. In February 2003, he became a United States citizen. Soon after arriving in the United States, he was discovered by a local soccer coach and began playing with boys several years older. Adu attended The Heights School, a private school in Potomac, Maryland, for several years.

While playing with the U.S. Olympic Development Program in an under-14 tournament against the youth squads of such traditionally strong Italian teams as Lazio and Juventus, Adu's team won the competition, he led the tournament in scoring, and he was named MVP.

Club career

Signing with MLS
At the age of 14, Adu became the youngest American ever to sign a major league professional contract in any team sport when he was chosen by D.C. United as the number one overall pick in the 2004 MLS SuperDraft. In order to allow Adu to play close to home, MLS assigned him to D.C. United on November 18, 2003, working a deal with the Dallas Burn, who owned the top pick in the 2004 MLS SuperDraft. Dallas was compensated with a player allocation. Having already signed with D.C. United, Adu effectively became the first player selected in that draft, two months before it officially took place. D.C. United had previously signed American youngsters Bobby Convey in 2000 and Santino Quaranta in 2001—both aged 16 and the youngest players in MLS at the times of being drafted.

D.C. United

On April 3, Adu came on in United's first game of the 2004 season against the San Jose Earthquakes as a second-half substitute, making him the youngest player ever to appear in United States professional sports. On April 17, at the age of fourteen, Adu scored his first professional goal in the 75th minute of a 3–2 away loss against the MetroStars. In doing so, he became the youngest player in MLS history to score a goal.

In his first season as a pro, Adu finished the year with five goals and three assists, while playing in all 30 regular season games. Although briefly a starter, Adu was relegated to a substitute when D.C. United acquired central midfielder Christian Gómez mid-season, and it was in this role that he appeared in United's MLS Cup victory. He played in three of four playoff games for D.C. United, assisting one goal during that time.

Adu was criticized from a number of different angles in his first season as a professional. Some commentators suggested that Adu was too young to be playing professionally and that he needed more time to develop mentally and physically amongst players his own age. In his second season, he was suspended for one game after he complained about his playing time in the media. During November 2006, Adu had a trial with English club Manchester United for a fortnight, but he was not able to gain a work permit and so could not play in any competitive games, and only trained with several players from the Manchester United academy during his two weeks. Continued development, especially of his defensive skills, helped Adu become a starting midfielder during the 2006 season. In addition, Adu had been chosen to take spot kicks during D.C. United's two penalty shootouts—scoring on both attempts. He was selected to the MLS All-Star team twice, once as a commissioner's choice and once as the coach's. He was selected for the Best XI of the 2006 MLS semifinals by Soccer America magazine. In 2005, he was nominated for FIFPRO Young player of the year.

Real Salt Lake
On December 11, 2006, D.C. United traded Adu and goalkeeper Nick Rimando to Real Salt Lake in exchange for a major allocation, goalkeeper Jay Nolly, and future considerations. Adu made his debut for Real Salt Lake on April 7, 2007, playing the full 90 minutes in a 2–2 draw with FC Dallas. He scored his first goal for the club on May 20, 2007, converting a penalty kick in the 68th minute of a 2–1 loss to FC Dallas. Adu went on to score his second goal with Salt Lake from another penalty in a 1–1 draw in an exhibition against Boca Juniors. Adu was also captain of the U-20 United States men's national team in the 2007 FIFA U-20 World Cup, where he made an impressive showing. After the conclusion of that tournament, Benfica of the Portuguese Liga secured Adu's rights from MLS for a transfer fee of $2 million.

Benfica
On July 28, 2007, Adu opted out of playing for Real in their regular-season match, and later that day, boarded a plane to Portugal to negotiate with Benfica. On July 30, Benfica issued an official statement announcing that Adu had been transferred to their club. The following day, the signing was completed and he trained with the team in Lisbon. Adu cost Benfica US$2 million. On August 14, 2007, Adu made his debut with Benfica against Copenhagen in a UEFA Champions League qualifying match, coming into the game in the 37th minute as a substitute.

Loan to AS Monaco
In July 2008, Adu joined French club AS Monaco on a season-long loan, with an option to join the Ligue 1 club permanently at the end of the deal, an option that was eventually declined by Monaco. In July 2009, after participating in the Gold Cup game against Honduras, he returned to Benfica for training.

Loan to Belenenses 
Adu was loaned to Portuguese club Belenenses for the 2009–10 season. On October 13, Adu made his first league start in Portugal, a 1–0 loss to Nacional. Adu was injured just before half time, and was substituted. In December 2009 Adu's season long loan was cut short.

Loan to Aris 
Adu signed a 12-month loan deal with Greek side Aris in January 2010, joining fellow United States international Eddie Johnson. Assigned squad number 11, Adu made his debut on January 31 and assisted a 90th-minute goal by Johnson. He scored his first goal on February 14 against Ergotelis.

Loan to Çaykur Rizespor 
On February 1, 2011, Adu moved to Turkish Second Division side Çaykur Rizespor on what was his fourth loan deal away from Benfica. Adu made his debut for his new club on February 20. He set up teammates Mithat Yaşar and Gökhan Kaba with goals in a 3–0 win over Orduspor and was named Man of the Match. Two weeks later, on March 6, Adu scored his first goal for his new club in a 1–0 win over Gaziantep Büyükşehir Belediyespor.

Philadelphia Union
In August 2011, Adu returned to Major League Soccer, signing with Philadelphia Union, reuniting him with former D.C. United and United States national U-23 coach Piotr Nowak. Though terms were not disclosed, as per club policy, it was stated that he was not a designated player. Adu debuted for Philadelphia Union on August 13 in a match against FC Dallas and scored his first goal for the club on September 7, 2011, against New England Revolution.

Bahia
On April 5, 2013, Adu joined Bahia of Brazil. The deal also saw Kléberson move in the opposite direction. He was released by the club on November 7, 2013.

2014 trials
After his release from Bahia he started a succession of unsuccessful trials around Europe.
In February 2014, Adu began training with Blackpool. However, at the end of February they decided against offering Adu a contract, though they gave permission for him to continue training with the club to aid his fitness.
In June 2014, Adu began training with Norwegian club Stabæk, managed by former United States national team coach Bob Bradley.
In July 2014, Adu joined Dutch club AZ Alkmaar on trial, but he did not convince the club to offer him a contract.

Jagodina
After a trial with AZ that ended without a contract, Adu signed with Serbian club FK Jagodina on July 24, 2014. On July 25, it was announced that Adu had signed a one-and-a-half year contract with Jagodina. Adu made his debut for Jagodina on September 24, 2014, coming on as a second-half substitute in a Serbian Cup match against FK BSK Borča. This was to be his only first-team appearance for the club. Adu was released by Jagodina, who opted not to renew his six-month contract, on December 21, 2014.

Following Adu's release from Jagodina, Adu was linked with a move to the Swedish Allsvenskan in February 2015.

KuPS
On March 28, 2015, KuPS announced the signing of Adu on a one-year contract, subject to passing a medical. Adu also played some games for KuPS' reserve team SC Kufu in the Finnish third division. On July 7 of the same year Adu exercised an option in his contract to terminate it.

Tampa Bay Rowdies
On July 14, 2015, Tampa Bay Rowdies of the North American Soccer League announced the signing of Adu. Contract details of the signing were not disclosed. It was his 12th professional club. Adu made 13 appearances for the club before being released after the 2016 NASL season.

Las Vegas Lights FC
Prior to the 2017 MLS season, Adu went on trial with the Portland Timbers but was not offered a contract. Adu then went on trial with newly promoted Polish Ekstraklasa side Sandecja Nowy Sącz in August 2017. Adu joined the expansion Las Vegas Lights FC on a trial basis prior to the 2018 season. Adu was not selected for either of the team's first two preseason matches. He was selected for the third and final preseason match against his former club D.C. United, playing 30 minutes and notching an assist—the first assist recorded in club history and his first in nearly three years—in a 4–2 defeat.

On March 15, 2018, Las Vegas added Adu to the regular season roster. Adu made 14 appearances for the Lights and scored one goal for the club during the 2018 campaign. Despite this, Adu was released by Las Vegas at the end of their 2018 season.

Österlen FF 
On October 14, 2020, after a two-year hiatus during which Adu worked as a youth football coach in Maryland, it was announced that Adu had joined Österlen FF, recently promoted to the third tier of Swedish football. After signing with the club, Adu expressed his excitement to play professional soccer again, noting that he "skipped a lot of steps in the past but now he gets a chance to do it right." On February 16, 2021, after only a month in Sweden, it was announced that Adu's contract had been terminated by the Österlen FF administration after the club deemed Adu not being physically or mentally fit enough to be competitive in Ettan. Adu claimed that internal conflict within the club was the reason for his exit. “There is some kind of power struggle going on in the club,” Adu told Swedish outlet Sportbladet in a written statement. "The coach (Agim Sopi) says that I was released without his approval, which he does not like. I have been in a similar situation before and it never ends happily. It is better to deal with it immediately." However, Österlen manager Agim Sopi told Swedish outlet Fotbollskanalen, "He has said that he wants to resume his career and then I think you want to show yourself from your best side, but he was totally untrained when he came here. His physical status was zero." "We gave him a chance a month or so to see,” Sopi commented on Adu's stint at the club. “But when you are away for so long. He has barely trained with us. He has had defects all along and I do not see that he has the mental strength required to recover."

International career

Youth teams
Adu played for the United States in five international youth tournaments: the 2003 FIFA U-17 World Championship in Finland, the 2003 FIFA World Youth Championship in the United Arab Emirates, the 2005 FIFA World Youth Championship in the Netherlands, the 2007 FIFA U-20 World Cup in Canada, and the 2008 Summer Olympics.

Adu captained the United States under-20 men's national team in January 2007 as it qualified for the 2007 FIFA U-20 World Cup in Canada. By playing in the 2007 tournament finals, held from June to July, Adu became only the second player in the world to play in three FIFA U-20 World Cups. On July 3, 2007, Adu scored a hat-trick in the United States' 6–1 victory over Poland in the group stage of the tournament. This accomplishment made him the first player to ever score a hat trick in both the under-20 and U-17 World Cups. In the following 2–1 victory over Brazil Adu assisted on both United States goals by Jozy Altidore.

Adu helped lead the under-23 men's national team in its campaign to qualify for the 2008 Summer Olympics in Beijing, China. He scored two goals from free kicks in the United States' 3–0 win over Canada in the semifinals of the tournament, which ultimately qualified them for the Olympics along with Honduras. He scored four goals in total in the three games in which he played, leading all players in scoring, and was selected to the tournament Best XI.

Adu was named to the 18-man squad that represented the United States in the 2008 Summer Olympics in Beijing. Adu played in the first two games of group play against Japan and Netherlands. He assisted on a Sacha Kljestan goal in the Netherlands match, but he, as well as teammate Michael Bradley, was then suspended for the final game of group play against Nigeria after each player earned his second yellow card of group play late in the Netherlands match. The US team was eliminated from the Olympics after falling to Nigeria.

Senior team
Adu was recruited early in his career by the Ghana national team. Although he was open to playing for Ghana, he ultimately decided against it.

Adu was called into the United States national team's training camp by coach Bruce Arena in January 2006 for a friendly match against Canada. Adu was capped in that game on January 22 (at 16 years and 234 days), becoming the youngest player to appear for the United States national team when he replaced an injured Eddie Johnson in the 81st minute at Torero Stadium in San Diego, California.

Adu made his first start for the senior international team in a friendly against South Africa on November 17, 2007.

Adu played in both legs of the 2nd round qualifiers for the 2010 World Cup against Barbados on June 8 and 22, 2008, starting in the latter. He provided the assist on Eddie Lewis' goal, the lone goal in the 2nd leg of the United States 1–0 victory (9–0 aggregate) in Barbados.

Adu scored his first international goal (at 19 years and 170 days) as a member of the full United States national squad from a free kick in a November 19, 2008, World Cup qualifier against Guatemala.

Despite a two-year absence from the national team due to his increasingly unstable club situation, Adu was a shock inclusion in the United States roster for the 2011 CONCACAF Gold Cup, making the team despite playing for a second division club. After having failed to make an appearance in the team's friendly against Spain as well as the first four tournament matches, Adu was a surprise substitute in the semifinal against Panama, coming on in the second half of a scoreless draw for Juan Agudelo. It was Adu's pass from mid-field that freed Landon Donovan on a counterattack, where he was able to cross the ball to Clint Dempsey for the winner. Adu started the following game, the 2011 CONCACAF Gold Cup final vs. Mexico. He had a hand in both of the United States' goals as they lost 4–2.

Career statistics

Club

International 

Scores and results list United States' goal tally first, score column indicates score after each Adu goal.

Honors 
D.C. United
 Major League Soccer: 2004

United States
 FIFA Confederations Cup runner-up: 2009
 CONCACAF Gold Cup runner-up: 2009, 2011

References

External links

 
 
 
 
 
 Freddy Adu Interview

1989 births
Living people
People from Tema
Sportspeople from Rockville, Maryland
Soccer players from Maryland
American soccer players
American sportspeople of Ghanaian descent
Ghanaian footballers
Ghanaian emigrants to the United States
Naturalized citizens of the United States
Association football coaches
21st-century African-American sportspeople
20th-century African-American people
African-American soccer players
Association football forwards
Association football wingers
United States men's international soccer players
United States men's youth international soccer players
United States men's under-20 international soccer players
United States men's under-23 international soccer players
Olympic soccer players of the United States
Parade High School All-Americans (boys' soccer)
D.C. United players
Real Salt Lake players
S.L. Benfica footballers
AS Monaco FC players
C.F. Os Belenenses players
Aris Thessaloniki F.C. players
Çaykur Rizespor footballers
Philadelphia Union players
Esporte Clube Bahia players
FK Jagodina players
Kuopion Palloseura players
SC Kuopio Futis-98 players
Tampa Bay Rowdies players
Las Vegas Lights FC players
D.C. United draft picks
Major League Soccer first-overall draft picks
Major League Soccer players
Major League Soccer All-Stars
Designated Players (MLS)
Primeira Liga players
Ligue 1 players
Super League Greece players
TFF First League players
Campeonato Brasileiro Série A players
Veikkausliiga players
North American Soccer League players
USL Championship players
Footballers at the 2008 Summer Olympics
2009 FIFA Confederations Cup players
2009 CONCACAF Gold Cup players
2011 CONCACAF Gold Cup players
American expatriate soccer players
American expatriate sportspeople in Portugal
American expatriate sportspeople in Monaco
American expatriate sportspeople in Greece
American expatriate sportspeople in Turkey
American expatriate sportspeople in Brazil
American expatriate sportspeople in Serbia
American expatriate sportspeople in Finland
American expatriate sportspeople in Sweden
Ghanaian expatriate footballers
Ghanaian expatriate sportspeople in Portugal
Ghanaian expatriate sportspeople in Monaco
Ghanaian expatriate sportspeople in Greece
Ghanaian expatriate sportspeople in Turkey
Ghanaian expatriate sportspeople in Brazil
Ghanaian expatriate sportspeople in Serbia
Ghanaian expatriate sportspeople in Finland
Ghanaian expatriate sportspeople in Sweden
Expatriate footballers in Portugal
Expatriate footballers in Monaco
Expatriate footballers in Greece
Expatriate footballers in Turkey
Expatriate footballers in Brazil
Expatriate footballers in Serbia
Expatriate footballers in Finland
Expatriate footballers in Sweden